Dionysios Kokkinos (Greek: Διονύσιος Κόκκινος; 1884–1967) was a Greek historian and writer.

Kokkinos was born in Pyrgos in Elis.  He studied at the Medical School at the University of Athens, he otherwise cut his studies and he later educated history and literature.  He published the paper Mellon (=Future) as well as the Akropoli, Kathimerini, Patrida, Protevoussa, Elliniki, Proia and Ethnos.  He became a leader of the National Library and a member of the Athens Academy in 1955. In 1960 he completed his major work, the History of the Greek Revolution, in 12 volumes.

1884 births
1967 deaths
20th-century Greek historians
Greek journalists
Greek writers
People from Pyrgos, Elis
Members of the Academy of Athens (modern)
20th-century journalists